Mondeville is a commune in the Calvados department in the Normandy région in northwestern France.

Geography
It lies on the Orne, just east of and adjacent to the city of Caen.

Administration

Mayors of Mondeville

Population

Gallery

See also
Communes of the Calvados department

References

External links

Official website

Communes of Calvados (department)
Calvados communes articles needing translation from French Wikipedia